is a railway station in the city of Tōkai, Aichi Prefecture, Japan, operated by Meitetsu.

Lines

Station layout
The station has one island platform, and one side platform, serving four tracks (Track 2 is for through traffic, and has no platform). The station has automated ticket machines, Manaca automated turnstiles and is staffed.

Platforms

Adjacent stations

Station history
Shūrakuen Station was opened on May 10, 1917 as a station on the Aichi Electric Railway Company. The Aichi Electric Railway became part of the Meitetsu group on August 1, 1935. In December 2004, the Tranpass system of magnetic fare cards with automatic turnstiles was implemented.

Passenger statistics
In fiscal 2017, the station was used by an average of 6314 passengers daily.

Surrounding area
Shūrakuen Park

See also
 List of Railway Stations in Japan

References

External links

  

Railway stations in Aichi Prefecture
Railway stations in Japan opened in 1917
Stations of Nagoya Railroad
Tōkai, Aichi